Sussex Police is the territorial police force responsible for policing in the whole of Sussex. Its jurisdiction covers the ceremonial counties of East Sussex and West Sussex. The force is headquartered in Malling House, Lewes, East Sussex.

History
Policing in the county can be traced back to Brighton Borough Police established in 1830. A few years later on 13 March 1844, Chief Constable Henry Solomon was murdered in his office by a prisoner he was interviewing. He is believed to be the only chief officer to have suffered such a fate. Prior to 1830 local watchmen were appointed to provide some degree of law enforcement in the area. In 1812, there were some 12 watchmen who were responsible for the town. By 1814 the number had grown to 28 and at this time the title of constable was in use for them. By 1868 the force had grown to 100 officers and helmets replaced top hats. In 1918, the first woman was appointed as a police officer in this force. By 1930, it had grown to 216 officers. On 14 September 1933, Brighton Borough Police were the first force to introduce police radios.

Forces were established at various times for the counties of East Sussex and West Sussex, as well as separate forces in the boroughs of Brighton, Hove, Eastbourne and Hastings. In April 1943, in order to provide a co-ordinated approach to the wartime emergency, these forces were amalgamated to form the Sussex Combined Police, with headquarters at Haywards Heath. In April 1947, with the exception of Hove, policing reverted to the old system for another two decades. Hove remained part of East Sussex Constabulary.

On 1 January 1968, Sussex Constabulary was created from the amalgamation of Brighton Borough Police, Eastbourne Borough Police, Hastings Borough Police, West Sussex Constabulary and East Sussex Constabulary. In 1974, the amalgamated forces became Sussex Police.

Chief constables
Brighton Constabulary
Henry Solomon appointed 18 May 1838 (murdered in 1844 by prisoner)
Thomas Hayter Chase appointed 22 May 1844
George White appointed 21 December 1853
Owen Crowhurst appointed 7 December 1876
Isaiah Barnden appointed 8 August 1877
James Terry appointed 6 April 1881
Thomas Carter appointed 27 January 1894
Sir William Gentle appointed 26 September 1901
Charles Griffin appointed 5 June 1920
William James Hutchinson appointed 1 December 1933
Charles Field Williams Ridge appointed 1 July 1956
Albert Edgar Rowsell appointed 28 October 1957
William Thomas Cavey appointed 8 October 1963
Brighton amalgamated with East Sussex Constabulary, West Sussex Constabulary, Hastings and Eastbourne Constabularies to form Sussex Constabulary, 1968
Sussex Constabulary
 1968–1972: Thomas Christopher Williams (died 9 September 1972)
 1973–1983: George Terry
 1983–1993: Roger Birch
 1993–2001: Paul Chapple Whitehouse
 2001–2006: Kenneth Lloyd Jones
 2006–2007: Joseph Edwards
 2008–2014: Martin Richards
 2014–2020: Giles York
 2020–present Jo Shiner

Sussex Police Roll of Honour
The Police Roll of Honour Trust and Police Memorial Trust list and commemorate all British police officers killed in the line of duty. Since its establishment in 1984, the Police Memorial Trust has erected 50 memorials nationally to some of those officers. A list of officers of Sussex Police and its predecessors who died on duty (in progress) is shown below:

Key to rank abbreviations: A/x = Acting • CC = Chief Constable • ACC = Assistant Chief Constable • CEO = Civilian Explosives Officer • Cmdr = Commander • DC = Detective Constable • DI = Detective Inspector • DS = Detective Sergeant • Insp = Inspector • PC = Police Constable • Sgt = Sergeant • SPC = Special Police Constable • Stn Sgt = Station Sergeant • Supt = Superintendent • WPC = Woman Police Constable • WRC = War Reserve Constable.

Old Police Cells Museum
Opened on 4 May 2005 by Councillor Pat Drake, the then mayor of Brighton & Hove, the Old Police Cells Museum is located in the basement of Brighton Town Hall and offers an educational and entertaining insight into the history of policing within Sussex.

It provides an opportunity to visit Brighton Borough main police station for the period 1830 to 1967 and learn about the murder of Chief Constable Henry Solomon in 1844 by a prisoner. It is possible to view the old cells with their graffiti from the mods and rockers era, the policemen's wash room and uniform store areas, police memorabilia and artifacts. The museum also houses a unique collection of truncheons and tipstaffs, one of the largest in the country. This collection was made by Alderman Caffyn throughout his lifetime and is on permanent loan to the Museum from the Sussex Police Authority.

Organisation 

Sussex Police is commanded by Chief Constable Jo Shiner. The remainder of the command team consists of Deputy Chief Constable Julia Chapman, Temporary Assistant Chief Constable Jayne Dando and Assistant Chief Constable Dave Miller. Also forming part of the command team are the assistant chief officer, the director of finance and chief information officer although these roles are filled by civilian members of staff.

The force consists of three divisions, each being led by a chief superintendent: West Sussex, East Sussex, and Brighton & Hove.Divisions are sub-divided into districts, each led by a chief inspector, providing a local identity for policing. These districts are Chichester, Arun, Horsham, Adur & Worthing, Crawley, Mid Sussex, Brighton & Hove, Wealden, Lewes, Eastbourne, Rother and Hastings.

Sussex Police is also responsible for policing Gatwick Airport.

Districts are further divided into Neighbourhood Policing Teams (NPT), each led by an inspector. The NPTs are responsible for the bulk of the community work undertaken in an area, and look to deal with long term local issues including anti-social behaviour. Their role stems from the traditional view of 'bobbies on the beat' with police community support officers (PCSOs) providing a high visibility profile on the street, albeit with limited policing powers. Special constables also serve alongside various teams including NRT, Prevention and on specialist teams such as RPU and Dogs units.

Police response is covered by Neighborhood Response Teams (NRT) operating from a number of "hub" stations across the area and providing the initial response to most emergency and prompt attendance calls. These teams are led locally by a sergeant and overall they are managed by an inspector. These teams work 24 hours a day, seven days a week, 365 days a year. Secondary investigation of crime not dealt with by specialist teams – for example CID – is managed by Response Investigation Teams (RIT) who work closely with the NRT.

The force has a total of six custody suites located around the force area for the detainment of arrested persons. They are located in Brighton with 36 cells, Crawley with 27 cells, Eastbourne with 22 cells, Hastings with 10 cells, Worthing with 19 cells, and Chichester with 19 cells.

Police and Crime Commissioner

Oversight of Sussex Police was provided by Sussex Police Authority until November 2012, when this role was taken over by a police and crime commissioner following the first elections.  Katy Bourne was elected police and crime commissioner for Sussex Police on 15 November 2012, with a majority of 24,426.

The police and crime commissioner is scrutinised by the Sussex Police and Crime Panel, made up of elected councillors from the local authorities in the police area.

Sussex Police Authority had nine councillors (drawn from the three councils), three justices of the peace and five independent members.

Specialist units

Air Support Unit

Police aviation is provided across England and Wales by the National Police Air Service (NPAS). Prior  to its establishment in 2012, Sussex Police used to operate an MD-902 helicopter, callsign Hotel 900 jointly with the South East Coast Ambulance Service, providing both policing and emergency medical support to Sussex and beyond.  The closest NPAS base to Sussex Police is at Redhill Aerodrome in neighbouring Surrey. The helicopter's call-sign is NPAS 15 and it has a registration of G-CPAS. This aircraft was previously used by Cleveland Police until NPAS was formed.

Counter-terrorism
Sussex Police has a dedicated Counter-Terrorist Intelligence Unit (CTIU) which works alongside the rest of the force in protecting and reassuring the public, and reducing the risk from terrorism. The unit engages with communities, local authorities, higher education and universities and other local bodies, in order to prevent violent extremism. The unit also offers specialist protective security advice to locations deemed to be at a greater risk from terrorism.

The CTIU is involved in the disruption and detection of terrorist activity and has close links between local police and the communities it serves. It also works at ports and airports alongside Border Force

Dog Unit

Police dogs and their handlers are huge assets to the force and hold a vitally important role in safeguarding the whole of Sussex. General purpose dogs are one of the most effective means for tracking, chasing and detaining suspects, searching for stolen property and missing people, and assisting public order units with crowd control. Specialist search dogs are used for drug, cash and weapon recovery, for detecting explosives and for following the scent of a specific person. Dog handlers are also trained to deal with dangerous dogs.

Emergency & Operations Planning
The Emergency and Planning Team provides Sussex Police with the ability to plan for major incidents, natural disasters and large policing operations that occur throughout the communities of Sussex. The team delivers specialist equipment to front line officers, staff for operations and tactical advice to police commanders; this helps to deliver the best service possible to the public during critical times. The team also has responsibilities with regards to business continuity, local resilience partnership working and contingency planning.

Roads Policing Unit (RPU)

The Road Policing Unit (RPU) covers the whole force from three bases. Those bases include Sussex Police HQ (Lewes), Arundel and Hastings. The primary aims of RPU are to deny criminals the use of the road, tackle anti-social driving such as mobile phone use and drink-driving and to bring down the number of KSI (killed and seriously injured) casualties on the roads of Sussex. Vehicles in use include fully marked and unmarked vehicles of various types fitted with covert warning equipment.

Specialist Enforcement Unit (SEU)

The SEU was formed on 26 January 2021 with the sole task of denying criminals the use of the roads, particularly car crime such as car theft and ‘county line’ drug smuggling between counties. It differs from the RPU as it targets these specific areas.

Specialist Search Unit (SSU)
This unit was disbanded in June 2015, due to cuts in the police budget.

Prior to disbandment Specialist Search Unit officers searched where other police officers could not go. They were trained to search in demanding environments that needed specialist equipment, such as underwater (mostly inland waters), at height, in flooded areas as in the Lewes floods in 2000, and confined spaces. The team were experts in searching for missing people, stolen property, drugs, weapons and firearms, and they were also licensed to find and identify improvised explosive devices. A police boat was used by the unit to undertake marine patrols along the Sussex coastline and during diving operations.

Tactical Firearms Unit (TFU)
The Tactical Firearms Unit covers the entire force from two bases. Those bases include Sussex Police HQ (Lewes) and Gatwick. Firearms officers are deployed to incidents involving the use of firearms or other lethal weapons either on a spontaneous or pre-planned basis. They are able to be deployed across all of Sussex, dealing with high priority crime such as drugs, burglary and violent crime. All tactical firearms (TFU) officers are trained in conflict resolution methods, meaning every incident is resolved using the minimum amount of force necessary. Non-lethal methods used by officers include the Baton Gun for firing rubber bullets and the Taser stun-gun. Officers are rigorously trained in threat assessment and perception, ready to make split-second decisions to protect the public against threats of violence. Officers are required to complete a two-year probationary period as firearms officers at Gatwick Airport after completing initial training.

Use of drones
Sussex Police currently operates a number of different drone models in conjunction with Surrey Police to assist with searches for missing persons, road traffic collisions, major crime and industrial accident investigation, event planning and management, and to provide situational awareness to officers and commanders in a variety of policing situations. 
The drones are small battery powered rotor systems, commonly known as quad or hexacopters. They are powered by either four or six electric motors and take off and land vertically like helicopters.

Police cadets
Sussex Police, like many other forces in the UK, has police cadets. There are around 200 operational cadets in Sussex Police. Cadets within the VCC (Volunteer Cadet Corps) often have duties at police stations across Sussex. They have a similar uniform to non-operational police officers and police staff which consists of:

Standard issue white shirt and black clip on tie, black police fleece with hi-vis cadet badges, hi-vis police coat with cadet badges, black trousers.
Epaulette saying "cadet" and a visible rank designation (normally chevrons (inversed), although they have now switched to bars), these will be located on the shoulders of the cadet's shirt, fleece and hi-vis.
Standard issue police cap with a blue band and Sussex Police crest (without the crown) saying 'Sussex VCC'

Cadets learn many police skills as well as a student officer syllabus in preparation for joining as an officer. They also assist at public events and displays, as well as low risk police activities such as area searches for weapons (Weapon Sweeps), leaflet delivery.

Future plans
Proposals were made by the Home Secretary on 20 March 2006 to merge the force with Surrey Police forming a single strategic police force for Sussex and Surrey. Opposed by both Sussex Police and Surrey Police, the plans were effectively abandoned by the Home Office in July 2006.

In a report published by HM Inspectorate of Constabulary in July 2011, the impact on the number of police officers and staff partly due to the reduction to Sussex Police's budget following the comprehensive spending review is as follows:

In common with other UK forces, Sussex is being forced to save 20% from its budget by 2015. Whilst efforts are being made to minimise the impact of these cuts, inevitably there have been, and continue to be reductions in the numbers of warranted officers and police staff. In September 2010, Chief Constable Martin Richards announced plans to cut up to 1,050 police officers and staff over the following five years, saying that job cuts were inevitable as the force faced estimated budget cuts of £52m by 2015. It was estimated that about 500 of the affected jobs would be police officers.

On 10 May 2012, off-duty officers from Sussex police joined an estimated 30,000 others from around the UK to protest at the cutbacks in a march through London.

Online initiatives

In November 2011, Sussex Police became the first force worldwide to live stream unedited footage during a 24-hour period.

Published in March 2012, Sussex Police became the first force in the UK to launch a mobile based app for reporting crime.

Road casualties in Sussex

As well as preventing and detecting crime, Sussex Police have a responsibility to reduce the number of casualties on the roads. Additionally, in her 2012 PCC election manifesto, Katy Bourne said that the biggest issue raised in her Sussex Crime Survey was road safety. "Katy will encourage the police to target accident 'black spots' and high risk drivers and continue 'Operation Crackdown' to tackle anti-social driving." The following table shows the combined total figures for the number of casualties on the roads of East Sussex, West Sussex, and Brighton and Hove for the most recent five years for which data is available.

Arms

See also

Law enforcement in the United Kingdom
List of law enforcement agencies in the United Kingdom
Table of police forces in the United Kingdom
Police Memorial Trust
National Police Memorial

References

External links

 Sussex Police at HMICFRS
Sussex Police Headquarters  when it was based in Horsham between 1894 and 1973

Police
Police
Police
Police forces of England
1968 establishments in England
Government agencies established in 1968
Sussex